The Doll Maker of Kiang-Ning is a 1923 German silent fantasy film directed by Robert Wiene and starring Werner Krauss, Lia Eibenschütz, and Ossip Runitsch. A doll maker in China crafts a puppet which he is convinced is lifelike. He takes it to exhibit at a public event, but is outraged to find an even more convincing and beautiful doll there. It is in fact a real woman pretending to be a doll, but he becomes so obsessed he attempts to steal her and the film ends with her rescue and his tragic death.

The film had its premiere in Berlin in November 1923. It received a universally negative reception from critics who were particularly unimpressed by the attempt to portray Chinese culture using German actors. The film continues a wider theme in the director Robert Wiene's work which contrasts Western and Eastern cultures.

Cast

References

Bibliography

External links

1923 films
Films of the Weimar Republic
German silent feature films
German fantasy drama films
Films directed by Robert Wiene
Films set in China
Films with screenplays by Carl Mayer
German black-and-white films
1920s fantasy drama films
1923 drama films
Silent fantasy drama films
1920s German films